15 South African Infantry Battalion is a motorised infantry unit of the South African Army.

History

Origin
This battalion was established in 1994 from the ranks of the former Venda Defence Force. The unit badge reflects its location. Thohoyandou means "head of the elephant".

Operational Command
The unit resorted for operational purposes under the command of the Soutpansberg Military Area.

Insignia

Previous Dress Insignia

Current Dress Insignia

SANDF's Motorised Infantry
SANDF's Motorised Infantry is transported mostly by Samil trucks, Mamba APC's or other un-protected motor vehicles. Samil 20,50 and 100 trucks transport soldiers, towing guns, and carrying equipment and supplies. Samil trucks are all-wheel drive, in order to have vehicles that function reliably in extremes of weather and terrain. Motorised infantry have an advantage in mobility allowing them to move to critical sectors of the battlefield faster, allowing better response to enemy movements, as well as the ability to outmaneuver the enemy.

Leadership

References 

Infantry battalions of South Africa
Infantry regiments of South Africa
Military units and formations established in 1994